Turnor Lake is a community on the southern shore of Turnor Lake. From Highway 155 it is accessible by Highway 909. The community includes the Northern Hamlet of Turnor Lake and Turnor Lake 193B of the Birch Narrows First Nation.

The combined population was 598 in the 2011 Canada Census. Turnor Lake had 179 people and Birch Narrows (Turnor Lake 193B) had 419 people.

History 
The lake was once called Island Lake (Lac des Isles). In 1895, Birch Narrows had 5 families or 25 people in residence. Father Penard of La Loche mentions in his letter of 1911  that there were six or seven families living at "le Detroit du Bouleau" (Birch Narrows) 35 miles east of La Loche.

In 1938, Father Ducharme had a chapel built in the community.

In 1966, the people of Clear Lake were relocated to Turnor Lake. (Clear Lake had about 60 people in 1944 according to the Piercy Report.)

Demographics 

Birch Narrows Dene Nation 
As of June 2012, Birch Narrows Dene Nation had 409 members living on reserve and 299 members living at locations off reserve. It is affiliated with the Meadow Lake Tribal Council (MLTC).

Birch Narrows Dene Nation has territory at three sites:

See also 
Denesuline language
Denesuline

References 

Division No. 18, Unorganized, Saskatchewan
Northern hamlets in Saskatchewan
Dene communities
First Nations governments in Saskatchewan